Assani Lukimya-Mulongoti (born 25 January 1986) is a Congolese professional footballer who plays as a centre-back for German Oberliga Niederrhein club MSV Düsseldorf.

Club career
Lukimya began his career in Berlin with SV Norden Nordwest 1898, before moving to SV Tasmania-Gropiusstadt 73. In 2004, he was scouted by Hertha BSC, where he played for the reserve team.

After three years with Hertha, he initially signed a one-year contract with FC Hansa Rostock. In Rostock, he played for the reserves during his first year, before being promoted to the first team in 2008. In February 2008 he was rewarded with a professional contract running from July 2008 till 2010. On 9 March 2009, he was suspended from the senior team, and returned to play for the reserve team. On 18 August 2009, he was released from his contract and became a free agent.

He subsequently signed with FC Carl Zeiss Jena until 2010. On 20 April 2010, he announced his departure for the end of the season and signed for Fortuna Düsseldorf on a two-year contract the same day.

On 24 May 2012, Lukimya joined Werder Bremen, signing a contract until 30 June 2015. On 26 January 2016, Bremen announced Lukimya would leave the club for Liaoning Whowin. The reported transfer fee was €2 million.

On 31 January 2019, Lukimya returned to Germany, joining Uerdingen 05 on a free transfer.

International career
His first game for the DR Congo national team was on 20 August 2008 against Togo in a friendly game.

Personal life
Lukimya holds a German passport.

References

External links
 
 
 
 

1986 births
Democratic Republic of the Congo emigrants to Germany
Living people
People from South Kivu
Democratic Republic of the Congo footballers
Association football central defenders
German footballers
Democratic Republic of the Congo international footballers
FC Hansa Rostock players
Hertha BSC II players
FC Carl Zeiss Jena players
Fortuna Düsseldorf players
SV Werder Bremen players
Liaoning F.C. players
KFC Uerdingen 05 players
Bundesliga players
2. Bundesliga players
3. Liga players
Regionalliga players
Oberliga (football) players
Chinese Super League players
China League One players
Democratic Republic of the Congo expatriate footballers
Democratic Republic of the Congo expatriate sportspeople in China
Expatriate footballers in China